The women's 50 metre backstroke event at the 2015 European Games in Baku took place on 25 June at the Aquatic Palace.

Results

Heats
The heats were started at 09:30.

Swim-off

Semifinals
The semifinals were started at 17:37.

Semifinal 1

Semifinal 2

Final
The final was held at 18:59.

References

Women's 50 metre backstroke
2015 in women's swimming